Rodocanachi is a Greek surname originating on the island of Chios, and may refer to:

 Constantine Rodocanachi (1635–1687), Ottoman-Greek physician, chemist, lexicographer and academic
 George Rodocanachi (1875-1944), British-born physician
 Jacques Rodocanachi (1882-1925), French fencer
 Michel Emmanuel Rodocanachi (1821-1901), Greek trader and banker of London
 Paolo Rodocanachi (1891-1958), Italian-born Greek painter
 Pierre Rodocanachi (born 1938), French fencer

References

Greek-language surnames
Surnames